Gosselin River may refer to:

Gosselin River (Fortier River tributary), in Mauricie, Quebec, Canada
Gosselin River (Nicolet River tributary), in Centre-du-Québec, Quebec, Canada